Ecnomiohyla, commonly known as fringe-limbed treefrogs or marvelous frogs, is a genus of frogs in the family Hylidae. This genus was erected in 2005 following a major revision of Hylidae. The ten original species in this genus (E. rabborum and E. sukia are later discoveries) were previously placed in the genus Hyla. The generic name Ecnomiohyla comes from Greek ecnomios ("marvelous" or "unusual") and Hylas, the companion of Hercules.

Description
Members of Ecnomiohyla are moderately sized to very large frogs with distinctive scalloped fringes of skin on the outer edges of their limbs and relatively immense hands and feet. They are found in the canopies of wet forested highlands of southern Mexico through Central America to Colombia. They are capable of gliding using their webbed hands and feet.

Species
The genus currently includes 12 species,

The AmphibiaWeb lists the same species but also includes Rheohyla miotympanum in this genus.

See also
Flying frog

References

 
Hylinae
Amphibian genera
Amphibians of Central America
Amphibians of South America
Taxa named by Jonathan A. Campbell
Taxa named by Darrel Frost